Juan José Imbroda Ortiz (born 24 June 1944 in Melilla) is a Spanish politician who served as the Mayor-President of the Spanish enclave of Melilla from 2000 to 2019. He is a member of the People's Party (PP).

References

External links

Biography at El País

1944 births
Living people
Mayor-Presidents of Melilla
Members of the Assembly of Melilla
People from Melilla
People's Party (Spain) politicians